Redmond Bunn 'R.B.' Gautier Sr. (1877-1944) was an American judge and politician from the U.S. state of Florida.

Gautier was born in Putnam County, Florida. When he was a boy his family moved to Miami from north Florida. His grandfather, Thomas Nicholas (T.N.) Gautier Sr, was signer on the city's filing for incorporation. 

R.B. Gautier became a county judge, and later successfully ran for Mayor of Miami. He was seated next to Franklin D. Roosevelt at Bayfront Park in Miami in February 1933 when Giuseppe Zangara attempted to assassinate Roosevelt.  Gautier and Roosevelt survived unscathed but Chicago Mayor Anton Cermak was mortally wounded and five other bystanders sustained injuries. Gautier would run for governor in 1936 but lost in the Democratic primaries. During the Democratic primaries, he would receive 1,607 votes (0.67% of the vote).

Gautier died in Miami in 1944. His son R.B. Gautier Jr. was elected to the Florida House of Representatives.

See also 

 List of mayors of Miami
 Government of Miami
 History of Miami

References

External links 
 HistoryMiami official website of HistoryMiami (formerly the Historical Museum of Southern Florida)
 History of Miami PD

Mayors of Miami
20th-century American judges
People from Putnam County, Florida
1877 births
1944 deaths